Vishnu Rao is an Indian cinematographer.

Filmography

References

External links
 

Indian cinematographers
Year of birth missing (living people)
Living people